The Ministry of Finance is a cabinet ministry in the Government of Trinidad and Tobago. The head of the ministry is the Minister of Finance and is appointed by the President of Trinidad and Tobago on the advice of the Prime Minister. The incumbent, Mr. Colm Imbert, assumed office on September 11, 2015, and succeeded Mr. Larry Howai following the Trinidad and Tobago general election, 2015.

History 
The first mention of The Ministry of Finance was in 1956 when an elected Minister of Finance would replace the Official Financial Secretary (British civil servant), before Trinidad and Tobago, gained independence from Great Britain in 1962. The first Minister of Finance was Dr. Eric Williams, which followed the Trinidad and Tobago general election, 1956.

Ministers 
 Eric Williams, 1957-1961
 A.N.R. Robinson, 1961-1966
 Eric Williams, 1966-1971
 George Chambers, 1971-1974
 Eric Williams, 1977-1981
 George Chambers, 1981-1986
 A.N.R. Robinson, 1986-1988
 Selby Wilson, 1989-1991
 Wendell Mottley, 1991-1995
 Brian Kuei Tong, 1995-2000
 Gerald Yetming, 2000-2001
 Patrick Manning, 2001-2007
 Karen Nunez-Tesheira, 2007-2010
 Winston Dookeran, 2010-2012
 Larry Howai, 2012-2015
 Colm Imbert, 2015-

Divisions

The Divisions of the Ministry of Finance of Trinidad and Tobago 
(in alphabetical order)
 Budget
 Central Tenders Board
 Communications Unit
 Customs and Excise Division
 Economic Management Division
 Financial Intelligence Unit
 General Administration Division
 Inland Revenue Division
 Investments Division
 National Insurance Appeals Tribunal
 Office Of The Supervisor Of Insolvency
 Public Private Partnership Unit
 Strategic Management and Execution Office (SMO)
 Treasury Division
 Treasury Solicitor’s Division
 Valuation Division

References

External links 
 Ministry of Finance - Official Website in English

Government ministries of Trinidad and Tobago
Trinidad and Tobago